Fairlie George Dalpathado (17 August 1924 – 6 January 2010) was a cricketer who played three matches of first-class cricket for Ceylon in 1949 and 1950.

A middle-order batsman and medium-pace bowler, Fairlie Dalphatado was a champion schoolboy cricketer at St Joseph's College, Colombo. He captained the school's team in 1943, when they went through the season unbeaten and finished by dismissing the Combined Schools XI for 35, Dalphatado taking 6 for 17. After leaving school he had a long career in domestic cricket with Sinhalese Sports Club, and coached the cricket team at St Joseph's College for more than 20 years.

He represented Ceylon in the unofficial Test against the touring West Indians in 1948-49 and toured Pakistan with Ceylon in 1949-50, when he played in both unofficial Tests. He also represented Ceylon at tennis, competing in the first Asian Tennis Championship.

Dalphatado worked as a manager in the tea industry. He married an Indian lady, Therese Abraham, whom he had met while on one of his tennis tours in India. They had a son and two daughters.

References

External links

1924 births
2010 deaths
Alumni of Saint Joseph's College, Colombo
Sri Lankan cricketers
Sinhalese Sports Club cricketers
All-Ceylon cricketers
Sri Lankan male tennis players
Sri Lankan cricket coaches
People from British Ceylon